OpenNebula Systems, formerly known as C12G Labs, is an  software company that develops and provides commercial support for the open source cloud management platform OpenNebula.

History 
The company was first established in March 2010 as C12G Labs. Based in Madrid (Spain), the company was founded by the original developers of OpenNebula.
In September 2014, C12G changed its name to OpenNebula Systems, associating itself more closely with its product.

In April 2015, OpenNebula Systems created a subsidiary in the US.
OpenNebula Systems USA, LLC is located in Cambridge, Massachusetts. In September 2019, OpenNebula Systems announced that it was awarded  from the EU Horizon 2020 SME Instrument program to assist in the development of ONEdge, a project to bring the private cloud to the edge through cloud disaggregation. , the company moved its headquarters to La Finca Business Park.

Products 

OpenNebula Systems developed "OpenNebula", a free and open source program for data center visualization and cloud management. It is available for free in its "Community Edition", and for a subscription fee in its "Enterprise Edition". 

Version 5.8 of this software, "Edge", was released c. June 2019. Version 6.0, "Mutara" was released c. April 2021.

People 
Ignacio M. Llorente is OpenNebula Systems's CEO, cofounder, and director.

See also

 Apache CloudStack
 AppScale
 Amazon Web Services
 Canonical (company)
 Microsoft Azure
 Mirantis
 OnApp
 OpenStack
 Red Hat
 SoftLayer
 VMware

References

External links
Official website
ONEedge

Software companies of Spain
Cloud infrastructure
Software companies established in 2010
Cloud computing providers
Free software companies
Companies based in Madrid